The Amanogawa, Amano-gawa or Amano is a river in Japan, which passes through Hirakata, near Osaka. The name means "heavenly river", and is also the Japanese name for the Milky Way.

The river empties into the Yodo River.

References 

Rivers of Japan
Geography of Osaka Prefecture